The Articella is a collection of medical treatises bound together in one volume that was used mainly as a textbook and reference manual between the 13th and the 16th centuries. In medieval times, several versions of this anthology circulated in manuscript form among medical students. Between 1476 and 1534, printed editions of the Articella were also published in several European cities.

The collection grew around a synthetic exposition of classical Greek medicine written in Baghdad by the physician and polyglot Hunayn bin Ishaq, better known in the West as Ioannitius. His synthesis was in turn based on Galen's Ars Medica (Techne iatrike) and thus became known in Europe as Isagoge Ioannitii ad Tegni Galieni (Hunayn's Introduction to the Art of Galen).

In the mid-13th century, the emergence of formal medical education in several European universities fueled a demand for comprehensive textbooks. Instructors from the influential Scuola Medica Salernitana popularized the practice of binding other treatises together with their manuscript copies of the Isagoge. These included Hippocrates’ Prognostics as well as his Aphorisms, Theophilus Protospatharius's De Urinis and De Pulsibus and many other classic works.

See also

 Medieval medicine of Western Europe

References 

 Cornelius O'Boyle. Thirteenth- and Fourteenth-Century Copies of the "Ars Medicine": A Checklist and Contents Descriptions of the Manuscripts. Articella Studies: Texts and Interpretations in Medieval and Renaissance Medical Teaching, no. 1. Cambridge: Cambridge Wellcome Unit for the History of Medicine, and CSIC Barcelona, Department of History of Science, 1998.
 Jon Arrizabalaga. The "Articella" in the Early Press, c. 1476-1534. Articella Studies: Texts and Interpretations in Medieval and Renaissance Medical Teaching, no. 2. Cambridge: Cambridge Wellcome Unit for the History of Medicine, and CSIC Barcelona, Department of History of Science, 1998.
 Papers of the Articella Project Meeting, Cambridge, December 1995. Articella Studies: Texts and Interpretations in Medieval and Renaissance Medical Teaching, no. 3. Cambridge: Cambridge Wellcome Unit for the History of Medicine, and CSIC Barcelona, Department of History of Science, 1998.

External links
 
Medieval manuscripts - Articella

History of medicine
Medical books
Medieval books